Mi mujer y yo is a Mexican telenovela produced by Televisa for Telesistema Mexicano in 1963.

Cast 
Enrique Rambal
Lucy Gallardo
Luis Aragón
Fanny Schiller
José Galvéz
Martha Patricia
León Barroso
Rafael del Río
Augusto Benedico

References

External links 

Mexican telenovelas
1963 telenovelas
Televisa telenovelas
1963 Mexican television series debuts
1963 Mexican television series endings
Spanish-language telenovelas